The A10 Baldwin class steam locomotive was a 4-4-0 locomotive of the Queensland Railways (QR).

The locomotives operated on  gauge. The “A”, is used to identify the number of coupled wheels, being four coupled wheels for the A10 class, followed by numerals indicating the cylinder diameter of ten inches.  Baldwin indicates that the builder was the Baldwin Locomotive Works, United States.

History
There were two Baldwin A10's purchased and they entered service on the Northern Railway (Townsville Region). These small engines were also ordered  at a cost of £1,690 each. They entered service as No.2 on the 1 March 1881 and No.3 on the 6 November, 1881. In 1886 No.2 was renumbered No.1 and No.3 became No.2. In 1888, No.1 was transferred to the Bowen Railway as its No.1. In 1890, Nos 1 and 2 were integrated into the Queensland Government Railways (QGR) numbering list as No.2 became QGR No.176 and Bowen Railway No. 1 became QGR No.177 respectively. In 1895, No.177 was condemned at Bowen and No.176 was transferred to that line from the Northern Railway in September 1895. In 1902 No.176 was shown as condemned in the commissioners report.

See also
 Rail transport in Queensland
 List of Queensland steam locomotives

References

A10 Baldwin
4-4-0 locomotives
Baldwin locomotives
Railway locomotives introduced in 1897
3 ft 6 in gauge locomotives of Australia
Scrapped locomotives
Cape gauge railway locomotives